Charles Johnson Woodbury (15 September 1844 – 13 May 1927) was a lecturer on poetry & literature. He was a student of Ralph Waldo Emerson and wrote the book Talks With Ralph Waldo Emerson.

References 

1844 births
1927 deaths
19th-century American poets
American male poets
19th-century American male writers